The 2006 FIFA World Cup qualification UEFA Group 8 was a UEFA qualifying group for the 2006 FIFA World Cup. The group comprised Bulgaria, Croatia, Hungary, Iceland, Malta and  Sweden.

The group was won by Croatia, who qualified for the 2006 FIFA World Cup. The runners-up Sweden also qualified as one of two best runners-up.

Standings

Matches

Goalscorers

8 goals

 Zlatan Ibrahimović

7 goals

 Dimitar Berbatov
 Freddie Ljungberg

6 goals

 Eiður Guðjohnsen

5 goals

 Darijo Srna
 Henrik Larsson

4 goals

 Dado Pršo
 Zoltán Gera

3 goals

 Martin Petrov

2 goals

 Hristo Yanev
 Chavdar Yankov
 Boško Balaban
 Niko Kranjčar
 Igor Tudor
 Péter Rajczi
 Sándor Torghelle
 Anders Svensson
 Christian Wilhelmsson

1 goal

 Georgi Iliev
 Zdravko Lazarov
 Stiliyan Petrov
 Marko Babić
 Ivan Klasnić
 Niko Kovač
 Josip Šimunić
 Szabolcs Huszti
 Péter Kovács
 Imre Szabics
 Ákos Takács
 Kári Árnason
 Veigar Páll Gunnarsson
 Tryggvi Guðmundsson
 Hermann Hreiðarsson
 Indriði Sigurðsson
 Kristján Örn Sigurðsson
 Grétar Steinsson
 Gunnar Heiðar Þorvaldsson
 Etienne Barbara
 Michael Mifsud
 Brian Said
 Stephen Wellman
 Marcus Allbäck
 Erik Edman
 Johan Elmander
 Mattias Jonson
 Kim Källström
 Olof Mellberg

1 own goal

 Gábor Gyepes (playing against Croatia)
 Brian Said (playing against Hungary)

See also 

8
2004–05 in Bulgarian football
2005–06 in Bulgarian football
2004 in Swedish football
2005 in Swedish football
Qual
2004 in Icelandic football
2005 in Icelandic football
2004–05 in Croatian football
Qual
2004–05 in Hungarian football
2005–06 in Hungarian football
2004–05 in Maltese football
2005–06 in Maltese football